Isel Saavedra  (born ) is a retired Cuban female volleyball player. She was part of the Cuba women's national volleyball team.

She participated in the 1994 FIVB Volleyball Women's World Championship. On club level she played with Pinar Del Rio.

Clubs
 Pinar Del Rio (1994)

References

1971 births
Living people
Cuban women's volleyball players
Place of birth missing (living people)